Google Optimize, (GO) formerly called Google Website Optimizer, is a freemium web analytics and testing tool by Google. It allows running some experiments that are aimed to help online marketers and webmasters to increase visitor conversion rates and overall visitor satisfaction.

The Google Optimize website is used to design experiments and open a WYSIWYG editor for each version tested in the experiment. The free version allows running a few experiments at the same time and a user needs to upgrade to Google Optimize 360 to run more of them. There are also other limits including limited audience targeting options.

The Google Optimize editor is a Chrome extension that allows changing some aspects of visible HTML elements. Changes are then applied with JavaScript tailored by rules set in an experiment. Changes can include replacing labels on buttons and links and some style changes like a font change, text alignment and such. You can also modify HTML inside chosen elements which allows adding more advanced changes. This allows presenting alternative version of a static page to different users. GO allows running some A/B tests — or test multiple combinations of page elements such as headings, images, or body copy; known as multivariate testing. Other tests include A/B/n testing where "n" refers to an unknown number of variations a user will test. Split URL testing or redirect testing can be used to check how individual pages are working against each other. Server-Side testing can be used to view reports and results. It could be used at multiple stages in the conversion funnel.

The editor alone will not work for creating complicated tests especially on pages with dynamic content such as Angular, Vue or React. To use GO on more complicated, dynamic pages, manual work by programmers is required to integrate experiments into frontend or backend code.

On 1 June 2012, Google announced that Google Website Optimizer (the predecessor to Google Optimize) as a separate product would be retired as of 1 August 2012, and its functionality would be integrated into Google Analytics as Google Analytics Content Experiments. However, Google revived Google Website Optimizer as Google Optimize, which allows connecting to Google Analytics to run the tests and design experiments on the GO website.

Google Optimize and Optimize 360 was announced to be sunset and no longer available after September 30, 2023.

Google Optimize is part of the Google Marketing Platform.

See also
Google PageSpeed Tools
Google Analytics
Google Search Console
Google Trends
Google Search
Google Ads
Google Ad Manager
Google Tag Manager
Gmail
Google Drive

References
10. Google Optimize Sunset( the end of Era)

Optimize
Web analytics
Products and services discontinued in 2023